The Shapeshifters is the current alias of English house producer Simon Marlin and a former duo comprising Marlin and Swedish producer Max Reich, from Gothenburg. The Shapeshifters have been signed to Defected Records since 2008, and the duo were previously signed to Positiva. They are best known for their debut single "Lola's Theme", which went to No. 1 on the UK Singles Chart in July 2004.

Formerly producing and touring as a duo with Max Reich, Marlin has continued working and performing under the Shapeshifters moniker as a solo act since 2017.

His releases in the United States fall under the name Shape:UK, in part due to a trademark conflict with the Los Angeles-based hip hop group the Shape Shifters.

Biography

The Shapeshifters are best known for their debut single "Lola's Theme", which went to number 1 on the UK Singles Chart in July 2004. The track was originally released as an instrumental promo in 2003 and was inspired by Marlin's ex-wife, Lola.

Their second single, "Back to Basics", was released in March 2005 and reached number 10 on the UK chart, while the third single "Incredible" reached number 12. Their debut album, Sound Advice, was released in March 2006 and peaked at number 76 in the UK Albums Chart, before being released in the United States on Ultra Records in September 2006. The fourth single which featured Nile Rodgers of Chic, was called "Sensitivity" and charted at number 40 in July 2006.

In 2008, after four years with Positiva Records, the Shapeshifters signed to Defected Records. Their first release for Defected was "Treadstone" in April 2008, and this was subsequently followed by "Chime", a re-work of the Orbital track. "Chime" was also notably remixed by Martijn ten Velden. In September 2008, the Shapeshifters released The Shapeshifters – In the House—a mix album was part of the In the House series. In September 2008, the Shapeshifters also released "Lola's Theme ('08 Re-Edit)". This was originally an exclusive remix that the Shapeshifters used in their own DJ sets, but due to major demand and exposure, this title was released as a digital download through their own Nocturnal Groove record label. Upon its release this title spent seven weeks at number 1 on the Beatport sales chart.

In July 2009, the Shapeshifters released the Young Dubs EP which included "Sideways" and "Nocturnal". Throughout 2009, the Shapeshifters also remixed Natalie Imbruglia's single ("Want") and collaborated with Frankie Knuckles on "The Ones You Love" which was released on Nocturnal Groove. They also remixed Candi Staton ("Musical Freedom") and compiled the digital compilation, Nocturnal Grooves: Vol. 2 – Mixed by the Shapeshifters as well as working alongside Empire of the Sun and Kleerup remixing "We Are the People" and "Longing for Lullabies". The Shapeshifters first release of 2010 was Summerdayze 2010 – Mixed by the Shapeshifters—a compilation album released to coincide with their Australian tour in January 2010 and further singles such as "Helter Skelter" and "She Freaks" followed. Within the year, both "Helter Skelter" and "She Freaks" gained over 1,000,000 views on YouTube. In 2010, the Shapeshifters remixed "Broken Arrow" by Pixie Lott and "Looking Forward" by Jason Chance. In April 2010, the Shapeshifters began the Nocturnal Groove Radio Show, a weekly radio show broadcast through a range of international radio stations across the world, which is also available as a podcast on iTunes and is available to stream from the Nocturnal Groove website and the Shapeshifters' pages on social networks like Facebook and SoundCloud.

The Shapeshifters have also worked on productions and remixes for George Michael, Faithless, Frankie Knuckles, Christina Aguilera, Moby, Leona Lewis, Todd Terry and Danny Howells. In 2011, the Shapeshifters released "Waiting for You" – their first collaboration with Shermanology – and remixed "I'll Take You There" from Frankie Knuckles's Director's Cut project. As well as remixing Human Life's "In It Together", the Shapeshifters also released another remix album titled Nikki Beach – In the House: Mixed by the Shapeshifters via Defected Records.

In the summer of 2013, the duo released the album Analogue to Digital...And Back Again, with digital (download) and physical (CD) versions, which contains productions remixed by other producers in part one and remixes in part two. This album contains a huge part of their production work from the years 2008 to 2013.

In the late 2010s, as DJs, the Shapeshifters continue to release records and tour the world and return to Ibiza for a 12th consecutive year at the Pacha and Space nightclubs in 2016. In 2017, the group played for Glitterbox at the new Hi Ibiza.

During the summer of 2017, Max Reich stepped away from the outfit, leaving long term studio partner Marlin to carry on producing and touring. In 2017, the Shapeshifters released a new remix package of their hit "Lola's Theme", notably including a remix of "Purple Disco Machine".

In the late 2010s, Marlin released the singles "When Love Breaks Down" (2017) and "Try My Love (On for Size)" (2018), both successfully acclaimed by fans, other producers and DJs. Moreover, in 2018, according to official sources, Marlin continues to tour under the Shapeshifters name mainly in Europe.

The Shapeshifters collaborated with Chic's lead singer Kimberly Davis in 2019 and 2020 on the tracks "Life is a Dancefloor" (2019) and "Second Chance" (2020) which were released on Glitterbox, a sublabel of Defected Records.

Awards and nominations
{| class="wikitable sortable plainrowheaders" 
|-
! scope="col" | Award
! scope="col" | Year
! scope="col" | Category
! scope="col" | Nominee(s)
! scope="col" | Result
! scope="col" class="unsortable"| 
|-
! scope="row"|Brit Awards
| 2005
| British Single of the Year
| "Lola's Theme"
| 
|
|-
! scope="row"|Hungarian Music Awards
| 2007
| Best Foreign Dance Album 
| Sound Advice
| 
| 
|-
! scope="row" rowspan=4|International Dance Music Awards
| rowspan=3|2005
| Best Underground Dance Track
| rowspan=2|"Lola's Theme"
| 
|rowspan=3|
|-
| Best House/Garage Dance Track 
| 
|-
| Best New Dance Artist (Group)
| Themselves
| 
|-
| 2007
| Best House/Garage Dance Track 
| "Sensitivity"
| 
|
|-
! scope="row"|Popjustice £20 Music Prize
| 2005
| Best British Pop Single
|"Lola's Theme"
| 
| 
|-
! scope="row"|Smash Hits Poll Winners Party
| 2004
| Best Dance Act
| Themselves
| 
|

Discography

Albums
2004: Shapeshifters Present House Grooves (Virgin)
2005: Shapeshifters Present House Grooves Vol. 2 (Newstate)
2006: Sound Advice – No. 76 UK (Positiva)
2008: The Shapeshifters – In the House (Defected)
2009: Nocturnal Grooves: Vol. 1 – Mixed by the Shapeshifters (Nocturnal Groove)
2009: Summadayze 2010 – Mixed by the Shapeshifters (EQ Recordings)
2010: Nocturnal Grooves: Vol. 2 – Mixed by the Shapeshifters (Nocturnal Groove)
2011: Nikki Beach – In the House: Mixed by the Shapeshifters (Defected)
2013: Analogue to Digital...And Back Again (Nocturnal Groove)
2022: Let Loose (Glitterbox Recordings)

Singles

Remixes
2003: Mr Mike – "Do It Again" (Peppermint Jam)
2004: Danny Howells and Dick Trevor featuring Erire – "Dusk Till Dawn" (Cr2 Records)
2004: Patrick L – "Things We Wanna Do" (Onephatdeeva)
2005: We Deliver featuring Erire – "Breathe Again" (Nocturnal Groove)
2005: George Michael – "Flawless" (Sony)
2005: Candi Staton – "You Got the Love" (Positiva)
2006: G-Club featuring Haze – "Faith" (G-Club)
2006: Frankie Knuckles – "I've Had Enough" (Noice Music)
2007: Christina Aguilera – "Ain't No Other Man" (Sony)
2007: Leona Lewis – "Bleeding Love" (Sony/BMG)
2008: We Deliver featuring Erire – "Supernatural'" (Nocturnal Groove)
2008: Todd Terry All Stars – "Get Down" (Strictly Rhythm)
2008: Moby – "I'm in Love" (Mute)
2009: Kleerup featuring Titiyo – "Longing for Lullabies" (Positiva)
2009: Empire of the Sun – "We Are the People" (Virgin/EMI)
2009: Candi Staton – "Musical Freedom" (Nocturnal Groove)
2010: Pixie Lott – "Broken Arrow" (Mercury)
2010: Jason Chance featuring Michelle Weeks – "Looking Forward" (Stealth)
2011: Frankie Knuckles presents Director's Cut featuring Jamie Principle – "I'll Take You There" (Nocturnal Groove)
2011: Frankie Knuckles & Director's Cut – "Your Love"
2011: Human Life – "In It Together" (Defected)
2011: Cee Lo Green – "Bright Lights Bigger City" (Elektra)
2012: Something Good feat. Sansa – "Before Dawn"
2013: Soulmagic – "Someone Like You"
2013: Little Boots – "Broken Record"
2013: East & Young – "Starting Again" (Ultra Music)
2014: Lovebirds featuring Lisa Shaw – "Holdin On" (Defected)
2015: IDQ – "Where Are You" (Love Inc)
2015: Cee Lo Green – "Music to My Soul"
2016: Full Intention – "Just Go Back"

See also
List of number-one dance hits (United States)
List of artists who reached number one on the US Dance chart

References

External links
 The Shapeshifters Facebook page
 The Shapeshifters Instagram page

English house music duos
English house musicians
Ultra Records artists
Remixers
DJs from London
English record producers
Electronic dance music duos
Positiva Records artists